Cuminaldehyde (4-isopropylbenzaldehyde) is a natural organic compound with the molecular formula C10H12O.  It is a benzaldehyde with an isopropyl group substituted in the 4-position.

Cuminaldehyde is a constituent of the essential oils of eucalyptus, myrrh, cassia, cumin, and others.  It has a pleasant smell and contributes to the aroma of these oils.  It is used commercially in perfumes and other cosmetics.

It has been shown that cuminaldehyde, as a small molecule, inhibits the fibrillation of alpha-synuclein, which, if aggregated, forms insoluble fibrils in pathological conditions characterized by Lewy bodies, such as Parkinson's disease, dementia with Lewy bodies and multiple system atrophy.

Cuminaldehyde can be prepared synthetically by the reduction of 4-isopropylbenzoyl chloride or by the formylation of cumene.

The thiosemicarbazone of cuminaldehyde has antiviral properties.

References 

Flavors
Monoterpenes
Benzaldehydes
Alkyl-substituted benzenes
Isopropyl compounds
Perfume ingredients